A shotgun wedding is a wedding which is arranged in order to avoid embarrassment due to premarital sex which can possibly lead to an unintended pregnancy. The phrase is a primarily American colloquialism, termed as such based on a stereotypical scenario in which the father of the pregnant bride-to-be threatens the reluctant groom with a shotgun in order to ensure that he follows through with the wedding.

Rationale 
One purpose of such a wedding can be to get recourse from the man for the act of impregnation; another reason is trying to ensure that the child is raised by both parents. In some cases, as in early America and in the Middle East, a major objective was restoring the social honour of the mother. The practice is a loophole method of preventing the birth of illegitimate children, or if the marriage occurs early enough in the gestation period, to conceal the fact that conception had already occurred prior to marriage. 

In some societies, the stigma attached to pregnancy out of wedlock can be enormous, and coercive means (in spite of the legal defense of undue influence) for gaining recourse are often seen as the prospective father-in-law's "right". Often, a couple will arrange a shotgun wedding without explicit outside encouragement, and some religious groups consider it a moral imperative to marry in that situation.

By culture

Middle East 

Premarital sexual relations remain taboo across all social strata throughout the Arab world. In many cases, fornication is illegal and even a criminal offence under Sharia law. Even when it is not, the social response can be extreme, especially against women who have lost their virginity prior to marriage. 

In Arabic culture, shotgun weddings serve to obscure the fact that a baby was conceived prior to marriage. When that proves impossible, the social standing of the couple involved is irreparably damaged. Nevertheless, shotgun weddings help prevent the individuals involved, especially the women, from becoming social pariahs.

Apart from instances of regional slang, there is no universal, specific term for "shotgun weddings" in Arabic. This is because they are not recognised as a regular social phenomenon and because a successfully conducted Middle Eastern shotgun wedding is generally unknown to the guests. In some Persian Gulf nations, the term "police station marriage" (Arabic: زواج مخفر) may be the closest colloquial analogue for the concept of a "shotgun wedding".

East Asia 

The term can literally be translated as "oops-we-did-it-marriage", implying an unintended pregnancy. Notable celebrities with these marriages include Namie Amuro, Takako Uehara, Yōko Oginome, Hitomi Furuya, Ami Suzuki, Kaori Iida, Nozomi Tsuji, Anna Tsuchiya, Meisa Kuroki, Leah Dizon, Melody Miyuki Ishikawa, Riisa Naka, Rie Miyazawa and Emi Takei. A quarter of all Japanese brides are pregnant at the time of their wedding, according to the Health Labor and Welfare Ministry, and pregnancy is one of the most common motivations for marriage. The prevalence and celebrity profile of dekichatta-kon has inspired Japan's wedding industry to introduce an even more benign phrase, .
In China, the term 奉子成婚 means that the couple married because conception occurred outside of marriage. It is a pun on the phrase 奉旨成婚, pronounced Fengzhichenghun and implying that a wedding is approved by imperial edict. It is becoming increasingly common among China's youngest generation.  However, in the same age group, there is objection and criticism to such a practice.
In Korea, the slang term 속도위반 (RR: Sokdowiban; literally: "speeding over the limit") refers to the situation in which the pregnancy preceded the marriage.
In Vietnam, the term "Bác sĩ bảo cưới" (literally meaning "because [the] doctor said so") is often used with humorous intention.

Southeast Asia

The Philippines has a shotgun wedding tradition (Tagalog: pikot) where a man is forced to marry a woman for various reasons. Although the most common ground is impregnation, another variant of this practise include the woman's parents forcing marriage on the man to their daughter due to his social status or wealth, rather than his desire to marry her for love; this occurs even if the former did not penetrate the latter. Weapons may or may not be used in coercion, but other means include litigation, particularly when the woman's family threatens to file rape and lascivious acts charges against the man.
Indonesia has a similar condition with the Philippines; this is usually called "married by accident".

Europe 
Because of the sexual revolution beginning in the 1960s, the concepts of love, sexuality, procreation and marriage began to separate after being intimately entangled in social consciousness for centuries. However, sexual practice had not always followed social convention, resulting in shotgun or Knobstick weddings.

In the United Kingdom, one source reports that almost 40% of all brides were pregnant in 1850.
In Denmark, a 1963 study found that 50% of all brides were pregnant.
In the Netherlands and Belgium, the Dutch term moetje was a commonly used euphemism for marriage resulting from unintended pregnancy. The noun is formed from imperative of the verb moeten ("must", "to have to") with the added suffix -je, indicating a diminutive. Thus, it might be translated as a "little must" or a "little you-have-to", i.e. one is compelled to marry to avoid the shame of giving birth out of wedlock.Moetjes were a common occurrence in Belgium and the Netherlands during the first half of the 20th century. In the early 1960s, about a quarter of all marriages in the Netherlands were shotgun marriages; however, in some areas, up to 90% of the brides were pregnant. By the late 2000s, the practice had become so rare that the term was growing obsolete. According to a 2013 by the Centrum voor Leesonderzoek, the word moetje was recognised by 82.5% of the Dutch and 43.1% of the Flemish.
In Spain it's called casarse de penalty (marry by penalty)
In Italy it's called matrimonio riparatore (mending marriage)

North America 

In the United States and Canada, the use of duress or violent coercion to marry is no longer common, although many anecdotal stories and folk songs record instances of such coercion in 18th- and 19th-century America and Canada. The phenomenon has become less common as the stigma associated with out-of-wedlock births has declined and the number of such births has increased. Effective birth control and legalized abortion have also resulted in fewer unplanned pregnancies carried to term. Nonetheless a marriage which occurs when the bride is pregnant, even when there is no family or social pressure involved, is still sometimes referred to as a "shotgun wedding".

In popular culture

Films 
Acht Mädels im Boot (1932), German musical film
Eight Girls in a Boat (1934), American feature film, refilming of Acht Mädels im Boot
Nightmare Alley (1947), American carnival noir 
Seven Brides for Seven Brothers (1954)
Jenny, first Dutch fullcolour feature film, refilming of Acht Mädels im Boot
A Kind of Loving (1962), British feature film
Girl with Green Eyes (1964), Irish feature film
Shotgun Wedding (2023), American feature film

Books 
The Lonely Girl (1962), Irish novel on which Girl with Green Eyes is based

TV Shows 
The Simpsons, where Homer married Marge when she was pregnant with Bart.
King of the Hill, where Lucky Kleinschmidt married Luanne Platter when she was pregnant with Gracie.
Fated to Love You, a Taiwanese (ROC) 2008 TV Series where a poor secretary gets pregnant with an heir of a toiletries company. A Korean (ROK) remake of this drama with the name You Are My Destiny was also made.
The Amazing World of Gumball, it is revealed in the episode "The Choices", after learning that Nicole was pregnant with Gumball, she and Richard married.
Parks and Recreation, in the episode "London", Ron Swanson and Diane Lewis become married immediately following Diane's reveal that she is pregnant.
Bridgerton, Simon marries Daphne after a kiss in a garden
The Secret Life of the American Teenager, Ben marries Adrian because she is pregnant
Young Sheldon Mary Tucker marries George Cooper Sr. after finding out Mary is pregnant with their first child, George "Georgie" Cooper Jr. The marriage is not shown in the show.

 See also 
 Cohabitation
 Forced marriage
 Knobstick wedding
 Marry-your-rapist law
 Premarital sex
 Oklahoma!'', a play where one character, Ali Hakim, is forcibly coerced towards marriage on two occasions.
 Marriage of convenience

References

Forced marriage
Weddings in the United States
Weddings in Canada